Most of the 35 rivers and streams in Cyprus are small and impermanent. Melting snow supplies water to a number of these until late April. Others are merely winter torrents which go dry during the summer.

Rivers

Cyprus
Rivers